Alireza Nurbakhsh (born 12 August 1955) is the present Master (pir) of the Nimatullahi Sufi Order. He assumed this position after the death of his father, Javad Nurbakhsh on October 10, 2008.

Early Life
Nurbakhsh was born in a small town near Bam, the capital city of Kerman province in Iran. His family moved to Tehran when he was two years old. He lived in the Nimatullahi Khanqah (Sufi Center)  in Tehran until he left Iran for United States in 1977.

Education
After graduating from Alborz High School in 1973, Nurbakhsh attended Tehran's Melli University and graduated with a Bachelor of Arts in philosophy. He continued his post graduate studies at University of Wisconsin, Madison and received a PhD in philosophy in 1988. After moving to London he went back to school to receive a degree in law.

Selected articles/lecture

 Sufism, Love and Mindfulness 

 The Experience of Nothingness 

 Devine Love 

Sufism and the Way of Blame

Selected poems

 The Cupbearer  - Composed June 2017 - Banbury, UK
 Idol Breaker  - Composed December 2016 - Santa Fe, New Mexico, USA
 Love for the Friend   - Composed June 2016 - London, UK

References

Nimatullahi order
Living people
1955 births
Iranian biographers
Iranian emigrants to the United Kingdom
Iranian Sufis
People from Kerman Province
Sufi poets